Lewisburg Area High School is a small rural/suburban public school located in Lewisburg, Union County, Pennsylvania. It is the sole high school operated by the Lewisburg Area School District. Lewisburg Area High School serves: Lewisburg Borough, Kelly Township, East Buffalo Township and Union Township that collectively have a population of 19,173 people according to the 2010 US Census.

In addition to the traditional bricks-and-mortar format, the school offers a cyber school called Blended Academy, alternative education and technology and job skills training at SUN Area Technical Institute.

History
The school was originally the Lewisburg High School.

Student activities
A wide variety of clubs, activities and an extensive athletics program are offered to Lewisburg Area School District students. The district is a member of the Pennsylvania Heartland Athletic Conference. Music programs include band, choir, and orchestra with several ensemble groups. A fall play and spring musical are staged each year.

Sports
LASD is a founding member of the Pennsylvania Heartland Athletic Conference  for all athletics and participates under the rules and guidelines of the Pennsylvania Interscholastic Athletic Association. 
The district funds:

Boys
Baseball - AA
Basketball- AA
Bowling - AAAA
Cross country - AA
Football - AA
Golf - AA
Lacrosse - AAAA
Soccer - AA
Swimming and diving - AA
Tennis - AA
Track and field - AA
Wrestling - AA

Girls
Basketball - AA
Bowling - AAAA
Cross country - AA
Field hockey - AA
Golf - AA
Lacrosse - AAAA
Soccer - AA
Softball - AA
Swimming and diving - AA
Tennis - AA
Track and field - AA

According to PIAA directory July 2012

References

External links
Lewisburg Area School District
Lewisburg Area School District report card
SUN Area Technical Institute

High schools in Central Pennsylvania
Public high schools in Pennsylvania
Schools in Union County, Pennsylvania